Kanhai is a village in Gurgaon mandal, Gurgaon District, Haryana state, India.

Kanhai may also refer to:
 Kanhai Chitrakar (died 2013), Indian painter
 Krishn Kanhai (born 1961), Indian painter
 Rohan Kanhai (born 1935), Guyanese cricketer who represented the West Indies in 79 Test matches

See also 
 Kanai (disambiguation)